Moultonianthus is a monotypic plant genus in the family Euphorbiaceae first described as a genus in 1916. The only known species is Moultonianthus leembruggianus, native to Borneo and Sumatra.

References

Monotypic Euphorbiaceae genera
Acalyphoideae
Flora of Borneo
Flora of Sumatra
Taxa named by Elmer Drew Merrill
Taxa named by Jacob Gijsbert Boerlage
Taxa named by Cornelis Gijsbert Gerrit Jan van Steenis